Gian Paolo Peloso (born 18 December 1977) is an Italian violinist and conductor. He plays a 1710 Matteo Goffriller violin. He is currently a faculty member at the Hong Kong Academy for Performing Arts.

Biography 
Peloso was born in Rome, Italy, to a family of musicians. His mother is a violinist and his father, Paolo Peloso, is a conductor. During his years of training, he studied with Zinaida Gilels, Ruggiero Ricci, Viktor Pikayzen, Valery Klimov, Igor Ozim, Viktor Tretykov and Pierre Amoyal.

Peloso made his debut at the age of 10 under the direction of composer Luciano Berio. He has performed in Europe, Asia and the United States as a soloist with orchestras, in recitals, and in chamber music concerts.

Throughout his career, he has been invited to participate in the Kuhmo Chamber Music Festival in Finland, the Martha Argerich Festival in Switzerland, and has made appearances at the Società dei Concerti Foundation of Milan, the Moscow International House of Music, the Singapore Sun Festival, the Archipel Festival in Geneva, the Hong Kong Musical Fest, the Cannes Festival in France, and the Weill Recital Hall in New York.

He has toured extensively with the Camerata de Lausanne and performed chamber music with Sofia Gubaidulina, Mark Lubotsky, Vladimir Mendelssohn, and Bruno Canino.

Appointed Violin Professor at the Conservatory of Music of Neuchatel in Switzerland, he has recorded sonatas by Saint-Saens and Poulenc for the National Swiss Radio with pianist Filippini.

Peloso is a Sony Classical artist, and has recorded in New York violin sonatas by Respighi, Busoni, and Faure (complete sonatas) with pianist Bruno Canino. He is currently a faculty member at the Hong Kong Academy for Performing Arts.

As a conductor, he is a pupil of Jorma Panula. He has conducted the Kuopio Symphony Orchestra and Sofia Philharmonic Orchestra.

References

External links
 

Living people
Italian classical violinists
1977 births
Alumni of The Hong Kong Academy for Performing Arts